The Dacia Jogger is a car produced and marketed jointly by the French manufacturer Renault and its Romanian subsidiary Dacia. Its nameplate was revealed in August 2021 as a successor to the Logan MCV and Lodgy in the compact MPV market segment. Based on the third-generation Logan, it is offered in both five- and seven-seat variants.

Despite being intended to compete in the MPV market, the Jogger shares its platform and many parts with the Logan, making it essentially the wagon version of the model, similar to the MCV.

While the car has some "crossover" design flourishes, it is not intended to be used as an SUV.

Overview

Facelift
In June 2022, less than a year after its commercial release, the Jogger received, like the entire Dacia range, a slight update revealing the brand's new logo. The grille was slightly modified. The steering wheel was updated with the new logo, and all the other badges were replaced. The trim levels have been revised and a new Lichen Kaki colour is launched.

The Jogger is also available with a hybrid powertrain, dubbed the Hybrid 140, which refers to the  output, the same as the mild-hybrid 1.6 TCe 140 12V petrol engine found in the Renault Clio, Captur and Arkana.

The powertrain was revealed at the 2022 Paris Motor Show, with orders open from January 2023 and first deliveries arriving in March of that year.

In March 2023, Dacia unveiled the optional Sleep Pack for the Jogger, which turns it into a camper. The factory kit was announced at the Brussels Motor Show alongside the debut of the Extreme flagship trim for the Spring, Sandero Stepway, Jogger and Duster.

Safety

Euro NCAP
The Jogger in its standard European configuration received 1 star from Euro NCAP in 2021.

References

External links

 Official website (United Kingdom)

Jogger
Cars introduced in 2021
Cars of Romania
Compact MPVs
Euro NCAP superminis
Front-wheel-drive vehicles
Vehicles with CVT transmission